Trocaire (Irish trócaire, mercy) may refer to:

Trócaire, the Irish Catholic development agency
Trocaire College in Buffalo, New York